Mamele is a Yiddish Language Polish musical film made in 1938.

Synopsis
Set in Łódź, the film revolves around Khavtshi Samet (Picon), a Cinderella figure, who has taken on maternal responsibility for her family after the death of her mother — hence the title, Mamele, or 'little mother.' Khavtshi is required to shop, cook and clean up after her unappreciative family. Furthermore, she must keep her siblings out of trouble: her younger brother gets mixed up with crooks and her sister Berta (Bullman) has eyes for the gangster Maks Katz (Menashe Oppenheim). Eventually Khavtshi's morale breaks, and she moves in with the handsome musician Schlesinger (Zayenda) across the courtyard. In this period of distress Khavtshi imagines the life of her grandmother in a dream-like song and dance sequence. The Samet family begs for Khavtshi to return, which she does with Schlesinger. The film closes with Khavtshi busy preparing the feast during her wedding.

Cast
Molly Picon as Khavtshi Samet
Edmund Zayenda as Schlesinger
Max Bozyk as Berl Samet
Gertrude Bullman as Berta Samet
Simche Fostel as Nadirman
Ola Shlifko as Jentka Samet
Menashe Oppenheim as Maks Katz
Karol Latowicz as Zeisher
Max Perelman as Dawid Samet
Ruth Turkow as Bailchi
Lew Szrftzecer as Konchicker

Production
Mamele marks the second collaboration between Green and Picon after their success with Yiddle with His Fiddle. Green, by then an American citizen, was in Europe preparing for filming of A Letter to Mother, when Picon's husband (and manager) proposed that the two should make another film. Picon suggested to adapt the play of Mamele which she had performed years before onstage and although Green was reluctant to make a film based on a play, he eventually agreed. Green convinced the cast and crew of A Letter to Mother to hold off production for some time and Mamele was filmed in six weeks in the fall of 1938, mostly in Warsaw with some exteriors shot in Ciechocinek. Green took great care to show many aspects of typical shtetl life, depicting holidays, nightclubs, unemployment and gangsterism.

References

External links
Mamele at the National Center for Jewish Film

1938 musical comedy films
1938 films
Polish black-and-white films
Films about Jews and Judaism
Yiddish-language films
Yiddish-language mass media in Poland
Polish musical comedy films